The Raggy Dolls is a 1986-1994 British cartoon series which originally aired on ITV. The series is set in Mr Grimes' Toy Factory, where imperfect dolls are thrown into a reject bin. While unobserved by human eyes, the dolls come to life and climb out of the reject bin to have adventures. The series was designed to encourage children to think positively about physical disabilities. 112 episodes were produced.

History
The series was produced for Yorkshire Television from 3 April 1986 to 20 December 1994. It was created by Melvyn Jacobson, with scripts, narration, and music by Neil Innes. Yorkshire Television produced the first two series of The Raggy Dolls before awarding the commission to Orchid Productions Limited in 1987.

This was the first programme Yorkshire Television commissioned from an independent production company. Orchid Productions went on to produce over 100 more episodes of the series. The initial animator for Yorkshire TV was Roy Evans. After the move to Orchid Productions Mark Mason took over the role, animating and storyboarding 26 episodes, and storyboarding and directing other animators on a further 26 episodes before moving on to work on other children's shows.

He was replaced by Peter Hale from the 7th series onwards. The series was sold abroad to a number of other countries.

Characters

The Raggy Dolls

Sad Sack – A sample of a design that was deemed too expensive to mass-produce; his appearance is somewhat different from that of the others. He is the oldest of the seven Raggy Dolls in the Reject Bin. As his name suggests, he is very gloomy and cynical, but he still values his friendship with the other dolls.
Dotty - As the oldest next to the lethargic Sad Sack, she sees herself as the leader of the group and is often very bossy. She is so named because she accidentally had paint spilt on her hair and clothing. Dotty's main catchphrase is: "Good thinking!"
Hi-Fi  – He converses with stammer due to him being dropped during testing. It was also stated in the episode "The Trouble with Claude" that he was wired incorrectly, hence the stammer. He always wears headphones, which allow him to tune into radio and communication signals from seemingly any source.
Lucy – Her limbs are inadequately attached with nylon thread. She is shy and easily frightened, but always kind-hearted and loyal to her friends. She can be brave on occasion, as first seen in the episode "Ghosts". She speaks with a Derbyshire accent.
Back-To-Front  – He is a handyman doll with a backward-facing head (as a result of the manufacturer putting his head on the wrong way round) and a love of machines. Always calm in a crisis, Back-To-Front's catchphrase is "No problem!".
Claude – A French doll, who, unlike his companions, is actually perfect in every way. He fell out of a box of dolls being shipped to France and was left behind, being put in the bin out of a lack of other places.  He speaks with a French accent and sometimes alternates between speaking English and French. He also has a notable talent for cooking.
Princess – She should have been a beautiful princess doll, but the machine accidentally cut her hair and left her dress in rags. In the manner of a typical aristocrat, her voice is characterised by H-adding. As the opening titles indicate, Princess is the youngest of the original seven Raggy Dolls.
Ragamuffin – A wandering traveller doll who had lost his owner and decided to spend his life taking in new sights and experiences. Introduced in the fifth series.

Friends
Pumpernickle – A Scarecrow who is a friend to the Raggy Dolls.
Edward – Mr Grimes's lost teddy bear who becomes a good friend to the Raggy Dolls.
Mr Marmalade – Mr Grimes's pet cat who has a playful trait.
Hercules – An old farmhorse.
Rupert the Roo – An Australian toy kangaroo who had been mailed from Australia until he had become a new friend to the Raggy Dolls.
Natasha – A Russian Doll bought by Mrs Grimes.

Humans
Mr Oswald "Ozzie" Grimes – The owner of the toy factory.
Cynthia – Appeared later in the series to be Mr Grimes's love interest, and later wife.
Florrie Fosdyke – The kind but forgetful canteen manager of the factory.
Farmer Brown – The farmer of One Pin Farm.
Ethel Grimes – Mr Grimes's sister.
 Oz and Boz – Ethel's badly-behaved sons (and Mr Grimes's nephews), known as the Terrible Twins.

Episodes

Series overview

Transmission guide
Series 1a: 6 editions from 3 April 1986 – 8 May 1986
Series 1b: 7 editions from 20 November 1986 – 26 February 1987
Series 2a: 6 editions 13 November 1987 – 8 January 1988
Series 2b: 7 editions from 19 August 1988 – 28 September 1988
Series 3a: 6 editions from 16 November 1988 – 21 December 1988
Series 3b: 7 editions from 19 July 1989 – 30 August 1989
Series 4a: 3 editions from 6 September 1989 – 20 September 1989
Series 4b: 10 editions from 28 June 1990 – 30 August 1990
Series 5: 13 editions from 6 September 1990 – 29 November 1990
Series 6: 13 editions from 6 September 1991 – 29 November 1991
Series 7: 13 editions from 8 September 1992 – 1 December 1992
Series 8: 10 editions from 28 September 1993 – 30 November 1993
Series 9: 10 editions from 11 October 1994 – 20 December 1994

Later broadcasts
After the series ended, The Raggy Dolls later aired on digital television on the defunct children's network Carlton Kids and then on free-for-air satellite television on Tiny Pop.

The series was broadcast to many countries worldwide, with the exception of the United States.

Merchandise
Three videos (with 5 programmes each) were released during the late 80s by Castle Communications Plc, each featuring a selection of episodes from the first two series narrated by Neil Innes. They were later re-released in Australia during the early 90s by Castle Communications Australasia.

The Raggy Dolls (CAV 1008) – The Big Top, After the Storm, The Dark Wood, The Genius, The Winter Swan
The Raggy Dolls 2 (CAV 1014) – The Flying Machine, The Pigeon Race, The Fun Fair, Too Many Cooks, The Terrible Twins.
The Raggy Dolls 3 (CVI 1022) – Spring Toys, A Trip to the Sea, A Royal Tour, Onion Soup, Moving House

In the Spring of 1993, 4 Front Video released one cassette under 'Pocket Money Video' range (Cat No. 0867323) with six episodes- The Flying Machine, The Pigeon Race, The Fun Fair, Spring Toys, A Trip to the Sea, A Royal Tour

The complete first series of The Raggy Dolls was released on DVD on 21 June 2010 through Revelation Films; the complete second series was available from 18 October 2010; the complete third series was available from 7 February 2011; the complete fourth series was released on 6 June 2011, but the complete fifth series was never released.

Books
A series of at least 10 books were published in 1990 by both Boxtree Limited (in association with Yorkshire Television Limited) and ABC Enterprises (for the Australian Broadcasting Corporation).  The books were written or adapted by Neil Innes and illustrated by Steve Smallman. Titles include:
The Big Top
The Flying Machine
The Hot Air Balloon
In Days of Old
Moving House
The Pigeon Race
The Royal Tour
The Stolen Parrot
The Tree House
A Trip to the Sea
We Are Not Amused
The War Of The Wizards

References

External links

Toonhound page on the series
80sNostalgia – The Raggy Dolls

1980s British children's television series
1990s British children's television series
1986 British television series debuts
1994 British television series endings
1980s British animated television series
1990s British animated television series
British children's animated adventure television series
British children's animated comedy television series
British children's animated drama television series
British children's animated fantasy television series
English-language television shows
ITV children's television shows
Television series by ITV Studios
Television series by Yorkshire Television
Sentient toys in fiction